Bismarck Peak is a 7,585-foot-elevation (2,312 meter) mountain summit centrally located in the William O. Douglas Wilderness on land administered by the Wenatchee National Forest. It is also 24 miles east-southeast of Mount Rainier in Yakima County of Washington state. Bismarck Peak is situated east of the crest of the Cascade Range, southeast of Bumping Lake, south of Mount Aix, and northwest of Rimrock Lake. Its nearest higher peak is Mount Aix,  to the north-northeast. Aix and Bismarck are the two highest peaks midway between Mount Rainier National Park and Yakima, Washington so they are quite prominent. Precipitation runoff from Bismarck Peak drains into tributaries of the Yakima River, thence into the Columbia River.

Climate

Bismarck Peak is located east of the Cascade crest. Most weather fronts originate in the Pacific Ocean, and travel northeast toward the Cascade Mountains. As fronts approach, they are forced upward by the peaks of the Cascade Range (Orographic lift), causing them to drop their moisture in the form of rain or snowfall onto the Cascades. As a result, the east side of the Cascades experiences less precipitation than the west side of the crest. During winter months, weather is usually cloudy, but, due to high pressure systems over the Pacific Ocean that intensify during summer months, there is often little or no cloud cover during the summer.

References

External links

 National Forest Service web site: William O Douglas Wilderness

Cascade Range
Mountains of Washington (state)
Mountains of Yakima County, Washington
North American 2000 m summits